Vitéz Károly Bartha de Dálnokfalva (18 June 1884 – 22 November 1964) was a Hungarian military officer and politician, who served as Minister of Defence between 1938 and 1942. During World War I, he had several high commander offices in Budapest and Trieste. In 1919, he fought against the armies of Czechoslovakia and Romania. After the fall of the Hungarian Soviet Republic, Bartha joined the National Army led by Miklós Horthy. Béla Imrédy appointed him as Minister of Defence and Bartha kept his position in the ensuing governments until 1942.

While he was in office, plenty of major events took place: the First and Second Vienna Awards, the occupation of Bácska and Prekmurje, the bombing of Kassa thereafter Hungary entered the Second World War (1941). He played a large role in the unfortunate occasions of Vojvodina massacres. Horthy fired the government because of their pro-German stance. Bartha was replaced by Vilmos Nagy de Nagybaczon on 24 September, 1942.

Károly Bartha did undertake either a political or military role after his retirement. After the war, he was considered responsible for entering the war by the People's Tribunal. The Military Court downgraded him and later fired from the Magyar Honvédség. After the communist takeover, he was harassed by the police services, so he chose to emigrate to Venezuela, where he worked as a railway constructing engineer. He died in 1964 during a visit to Linz, Austria.

References

1884 births
1964 deaths
Military personnel from Budapest
Defence ministers of Hungary
Hungarian generals
Austro-Hungarian military personnel of World War I
Austro-Hungarian generals
Hungarian people of the Hungarian–Romanian War